This is a list of Romani poets.

Veijo Baltzar
Rahim Burhan
Rajko Djuric
Delia Grigore
Sandra Jayat
Usin Kerim
Ronald Lee
Baja Saitovic Lukin
Matéo Maximoff
Mariella Mehr
Mehmed Merejan
David Morley
Charlie Smith
Ceija Stojka
Katarina Taikon
Bronisława Wajs

 
Romani